This article lists the players that played for the different levels of the Italy national football teams while with Inter Milan. Players who represented Italy before or after they played for Inter are not included. The players who were called up to the squad but did not play in any matches are unlisted.

List of call-ups of Inter Milan players to the Italy national teams

List of call-ups of Inter players to the Italy national football teams

 Daniele Adani
 Ermanno Aebi
 Amedeo Amadei
 Antonio Valentin Angelillo
 Luigi Allemandi
 Alessandro Altobelli
 Giuseppe Asti
 Dino Baggio
 Roberto Baggio
 Salvatore Bagni
 Mario Balotelli
 Nicolò Barella
 Giuseppe Baresi
 Gianfranco Bedin
 Delfo Bellini
 Mauro Bellugi
 Giuseppe Bergomi
 Fulvio Bernardini
 Nicola Berti
 Mario Bertini
 Alessandro Bianchi
 Cristiano Biraghi
 Bruno Bolchi
 Roberto Boninsegna
 Franco Bontadini
 Ivano Bordon
 Lorenzo Buffon
 Tarcisio Burgnich
 Aldo Campatelli
 Piero Campelli
 Antonio Candreva
 Fabio Cannavaro
 Armando Castellazzi
 Carlo Ceresoli
 Aldo Cevenini
 Luigi Cevenini
 Francesco Coco
 Fulvio Collovati
 Leopoldo Conti
 Mario Corso
 Danilo D'Ambrosio
 Marco Delvecchio
 Attilio Demaría
 Luigi Di Biagio
 Federico Dimarco
 Angelo Domenghini
 Éder
 Giacinto Facchetti
 Riccardo Faccio
 Pietro Fanna
 Osvaldo Fattori
 Giuseppe Favalli
 Giovanni Ferrari
 Rino Ferrario
 Pietro Ferraris
 Riccardo Ferri
 Davide Fontolan
 Virgilio Fossati
 Angelo Franzosi
 Salvatore Fresi
 Annibale Frossi
 Roberto Gagliardini
 Giorgio Ghezzi
 Giovanni Giacomazzi
 Attilio Giovannini
 Fabio Grosso
 Aristide Guarneri
 Giovanni Invernizzi
 Spartaco Landini
 Ugo Locatelli
 Benito Lorenzi
 Saul Malatrasi
 Antonio Manicone
 Giampiero Marini
 Ernesto Mascheroni
 Marco Materazzi
 Gianfranco Matteoli
 Bruno Mazza
 Alessandro Mazzola
 Giuseppe Meazza
 Aurelio Milani
 Francesco Moriero
 Thiago Motta
 Maino Neri
 Fulvio Nesti
 Giovanni Pasquale
 Roberto Porta
 Renato Olmi
 Gabriele Oriali
 Gianluca Pagliuca
 Egisto Pandolfini
 Christian Panucci
 Giampaolo Pazzini
 Armando Picchi
 Silvio Pietroboni
 Alfredo Pitto
 Matteo Politano
 Andrea Ranocchia
 Enrico Rivolta
 Antonio Sabato
 Davide Santon
 Giuliano Sarti
 Luigi Sartor
 Stefano Sensi
 Pietro Serantoni
 Aldo Serena
 Francesco Toldo
 Nicola Ventola
 Guido Vincenzi
 Cristiano Zanetti
 Walter Zenga

List of call-ups of Inter players to the Italy Olympic football team

 Alessandro Altobelli
 Dino Baggio
 Giuseppe Baresi
 Evaristo Beccalossi
 Marco Branca
 Fulvio Collovati
 Salvatore Fresi
 Alessandro Pistone

List of call-ups of Inter players to the Italy under-23 football team

 Alessandro Pistone

List of call-ups of Inter players to the Italy under-21 football teams

 Enrico Alfonso
 Alessandro Altobelli
 Marco Andreolli
 Mario Balotelli
 Dino Baggio
 Francesco Bardi
 Giuseppe Baresi
 Alessandro Bastoni
 Nicola Beati
 Evaristo Beccalossi
 Mauro Bellugi
 Giuseppe Bergomi
 Graziano Bini
 Cristiano Biraghi
 Francesco Bolzoni
 Ivano Bordon
 Luca Caldirola
 Nazzareno Canuti
 Bruno Cirillo
 Corrado Colombo
 Mirko Conte
 Lorenzo Crisetig
 Samuele Longo
 Enrico Cucchi
 Marco Delvecchio
 Marco Davide Faraoni
 Andrea Ferrari
 Matteo Ferrari
 Riccardo Ferri
 Riccardo Fissore
 Salvatore Fresi
 Fabrizio Lorieri
 Felice Natalino
 Gabriele Oriali
 Antonio Sabato
 Davide Santon
 Luigi Sartor
 Nicola Ventola
 Cristiano Zanetti
 Walter Zenga
 Gianfranco Matteoli
 Luca Mezzano
 Giovanni Pasquale
 Andrea Pirlo
 Alessandro Pistone
 Alessandro Potenza
 Stefano Rossini

List of call-ups of Inter players to the Italy under-20 football teams

 Enrico Alfonso
 Mattia Altobelli
 Marco Andreolli
 Nicola Beati
 Simone Benedetti
 Matteo Bianchetti
 Giacomo Bindi
 Francesco Bolzoni
 Leonardo Bonucci
 Simone Dell'Agnello
 Paolo Hernan Dellafiore
 Giulio Donati
 Marco Davide Faraoni
 Salvatore Ferraro
 Jacopo Fortunato
 Luca Franchini
 Matteo Lombardo
 Federico Mannini
 Alessandro Potenza
 Davide Santon
 Giuseppe Ticli
 Paolo Tornaghi

List of call-ups of Inter players to the Italy under-19 football teams

 Marco Andreolli
 Francesco Bardi
 Nicola Beati
 Simone Benedetti
 Matteo Bianchetti
 Giacomo Bindi
 Cristiano Biraghi
 Luca Caldirola
 Lorenzo Crisetig
 Simone Dell'Agnello
 Paolo Hernan Dellafiore
 Mattia Destro
 Fabio Eguelfi
 Sebastiano Esposito
 Marco Davide Faraoni
 Salvatore Ferraro
 Nicolas Giani
 Andrea Lussardi
 Federico Mannini
 Riccardo Meggiorini
 Andrea Mei
 Matteo Momente
 Luca Moscatiello
 Felice Natalino
 Devis Nossa
 Simone Pecorini
 Alessandro Potenza
 Andrea Romanò
 Giacomo Sciacca
 Daniel Semenzato
 Luca Tremolada
 Niccolò Belloni
 Marco Benassi
 Simone Pasa
 Luca Garritano

List of call-ups of Inter players to the Italy under-18 football teams

 Marco Andreolli
 Marco Benassi
 Daniel Bessa
 Giacomo Bindi
 Francesco Bolzoni
 Luca Caldirola
 Giovanni Capuano
 Lorenzo Crisetig
 Mirko Conte
 Leonardo Longo
 Alessandro Cannataro
 Lorenzo Tassi
 Sergio D'Autilia
 Simone Dell'Agnello
 Mattia Destro
 Sandro Di Duca
 Matteo Ferrari
 Marco Fossati
 Giuseppe Galliano
 Luca Garritano
 Nicolas Giani
 Roberto Gimmelli
 Natale Gonnella
 Ivan Maruzzelli
 Andrea Mei
 Matteo Momente
 Felice Natalino
 Luca Palazzo
 Lorenzo Paramatti
 Simone Pasa
 Thomas Pedrabissi
 Andrea Polizzano
 Riccardo Ramazzotti
 Michele Rigione
 Andrea Romanò
 Giacomo Sciacca
 Massimiliano Sebastiani
 Alessandro Sgrigna
 Davide Sinigaglia
 Gionatha Spinesi
 Luca Stocchi
 Giovanni Terrani
 Paolo Tornaghi
 Luca Tremolada
 Simone Veronese

List of call-ups of Inter players to the Italy under-17 football teams

 Mattia Barni
 Andrea Bavena
 Nicola Beati
 Tommaso Berni
 Francesco Bilardo
 Francesco Bolzoni
 Luca Caldirola
 Nicola Cannataro
 Moreno Capra
 Matteo Capuano
 Davide Cattaneo
 Matteo Colombi
 Lorenzo Crisetig
 Sergio D'Autilia
 Marco Dalla Costa
 Simone Dell'Agnello
 Mattia Destro
 Fabio Eguelfi
 Matteo Ferrari
 Salvatore Ferraro
 Alessandro Fioretti
 Riccardo Fochesato
 Marco Ezio Fossati
 Virgilio Fossati
 Alberto Gallinetta
 Geremy Lombardi
 Andrea Mei
 Riccardo Melgrati
 Andrea Monachello
 Davide Moreo
 Felice Natalino
 Lorenzo Paramatti
 Simone Pasa
 Simone Pecorini
 Thomas Pedrabissi
 Andrea Polizzano
 Riccardo Ramazzotti
 Michele Rigione
 Andrea Romanò
 Davide Santon
 Daniel Semenzato
 Vincenzo Sgambato
 Alessandro Sgrigna
 Giacomo Sciacca
 Paolo Tornaghi
 Carlo Raffaele Trezzi
 Marco Varaldi

List of call-ups of Inter players to the Italy under-16 football teams

 Alessandro Alessandri
 Mattia Barni
 Andrea Bavena
 Nicola Beati
 Tommaso Berni
 Luca Bonfiglio
 Francesco Bilardo
 Alessandro Businaro
 Luca Caldirola
 Alessandro Cannataro
 Moreno Capra
 Giovanni Capuano
 Davide Costa
 Lorenzo Crisetig
 Simone Dell'Agnello
 Andrea Delle Donne
 Mattia Destro
 Dennis Esposito
 Andrea Ferlino
 Salvatore Ferraro
 Riccardo Gaiola
 Alberto Gallinetta
 Natale Gonnella
 Geremy Lombardi
 Andrea Mei
 Diego Mella
 Andrea Mira
 Davide Moreo
 Matteo Momente
 Luca Moscatiello
 Marco Nichetti
 Lorenzo Paramatti
 Simone Pecorini
 Riccardo Ramazzotti
 Nicola Redomi
 Andrea Romanò
 Giacomo Sciacca
 Davide Sinigaglia
 Demetrio Steffè
 Paolo Tornaghi
 Carlo Raffaele Trezzi
 Marco Varaldi
 Edoardo Zita
 Alessio Bernardi
 Matteo Colombini
 Saulo Brambilla
 Mel Taufer

List of call-ups of Inter players to the Italy under-15 football teams

 Alessandro Alessandri
 Nicola Beati
 Tommaso Berni
 Federico Dimarco
 Luca Bretti
 Giovanni Capuano
 Alessandro Leopizzi
 Matteo Arcuri
 Riccardo Ramazzotti
 Nello Russo
 Davide Sinigaglia
 Fabio Della Giovanna
 Carlo Raffaele Trezzi
 Marco Varaldi
 Federico Bonazzoli

References
 Italian Football Federation official website

Italy
Internazionale